MediaCorp Channel 8's television series Against the Tide is a psychological drama series produced by MediaCorp Singapore in 2014. The series, which stars Christopher Lee and Rui En as the main characters, will explore the mind and psyche of the subject, with the struggles and darkness of humanity.

As of 24 October 2014, all 23 episodes of Against the Tide have been aired on MediaCorp Channel 8.

References

See also
List of MediaCorp Channel 8 Chinese Drama Series (2010s)
Against the Tide

Lists of Singaporean television series episodes